A list of films produced in Hong Kong in 1986:.

1986

References

External links
 IMDB list of Hong Kong films
 Hong Kong films of 1986 at HKcinemamagic.com

1986
Hong Kong
1986 in Hong Kong